(Italian for "The List Representative"), also known by the acronym LRDL, is an Italian pop rock duo formed in 2011 and consisting of Veronica Lucchesi and Dario Mangiaracina.

They debuted in 2014 with the album , by label Garrincha Dischi. In 2017, the band signed with Woodworm and released their third studio album, Go Go Diva on 14 November 2018. The record included the single "", which received praise from critics and was also part of the soundtrack of Paolo Sorrentino's TV series The New Pope.

La Rappresentante di Lista participated in the 2021 Sanremo Music Festival with the song "", co-written and produced by Dardust. They took part again in the competition in 2022, with "Ciao ciao".

Discography

Studio albums

Live albums

Singles

As lead artist

As featured artist

Guest appearances

Filmography
Cacciatore: The Hunter (2020)

References

External links
 

Musical groups established in 2011
Italian musical duos
2011 establishments in Italy